The Green banded goby, Tigrigobius multifasciatus, is a member of the goby family native to the western Atlantic ocean, from the Bahamas and Central America to northern South America. As the name implies, they are dark green with 17-23 pale green bars, and have a brown stripe through the eye interrupted with a bright red spot. It is believed by many that these markings imitate the Juvenile Schoolmaster Snapper.

Equally bright as their coloration is their personality; they are valued additions to reef aquaria, with a reputation for being friendly and entertaining.

Description
Tigriogobius multifasciatus have a generally fusiform shape.  At maturity they can reach a length of 3.5 cm.

In the aquarium 
The green banded goby is popular with aquarists and is generally considered to be reef safe.  It is especially suited to nano reef tanks because of its small size.

Because of territorial issues with their own kind in the small confines of a tank, they are best kept singly or as a breeding pair.

Conservation status
Tigrigobius multifasciatus is not found on the IUCN Red List.  The species is highly resilient, with localized populations able to double within fifteen months.

Reproduction
Gobiodon sp. start life as females, and are bi-directional protogynous hermaphrodites, meaning that when paired up, if necessary, one changes sex to form a breeding pair.  In the case of two females forming a pair, the larger of the two becomes male, and in the case of two males, the smaller changes sex to become female.

References

Fishbase.org
Fish, Tanks, and Ponds
"Fish Tales - Let's clown around with more Gobies - the Gobiodon species" by Henry C. Shultz III, Reefkeeping Magazine, October 2002 
ITIS Report, Gobiosoma multifasciatum
Protogynous hermaphroditism and gonochorism in four Caribbean reef gobies

External links
Sweetwater Zooplankton

multifasciatus
Fish described in 1876